Domenic Filane Figliomeni (born March 17, 1969 in Terrace Bay, Ontario) is a former boxer from Canada, who competed for his native country at two consecutive Summer Olympics, starting in 1992.

Nicknamed "Hollywood", he was Canadian Boxing Champion from 1990 to 1999 in the Light Flyweight Division (48 kg), and twice won the bronze medal at the Commonwealth Games: in 1990 and 1994. After his boxing career he started a boxing training center in Schreiber, Ontario.

External links
 Domenic 'Hollywood' Filane
 
 
 
 

1969 births
Living people
Canadian male boxers
Light-flyweight boxers
Olympic boxers of Canada
Boxers at the 1992 Summer Olympics
Boxers at the 1996 Summer Olympics
Pan American Games competitors for Canada
Boxers at the 1995 Pan American Games
Boxers at the 1999 Pan American Games
Commonwealth Games bronze medallists for Canada
Commonwealth Games medallists in boxing
Boxers at the 1990 Commonwealth Games
Boxers at the 1994 Commonwealth Games
Boxers at the 1998 Commonwealth Games
Canadian people of Italian descent
Canadian people of Calabrian descent
Boxing people from Ontario
People from Thunder Bay District
Medallists at the 1990 Commonwealth Games
Medallists at the 1994 Commonwealth Games